The Federal Women's Committee of the Liberal Party of Australia was formed in August 1945 at the inaugural meeting of the party's Federal Council.  That year the influential lobby group The Australian Women's National League merged with the Liberal Party, and as a result the Federal Constitution for the Party made specific provisions for the roles women would play in the party.  In October 1946, the constitution established the Federal Women's Committee as a structural feature of the Party.

The Liberal Party maintains at a state level the Liberal Women's Councils for the state of Victoria and New South Wales. It is unknown if the other states maintain such state councils in addition to the overarching Federal Women's Committee of the Liberal Party of Australia.

Chairmen / Presidents
 1945-46: Miss Margaret Battye WA
 1947: Miss Roberta Gallagher NSW
 1948: Mrs W. S. Lettice QLD
 1949: Mrs M. Hodgson VIC
 1950: Miss Millie Best MBE TAS
 1951: Mrs (later Lady) Kathleen Sandover OBE JP WA
 1952: Mrs (later Dame) Marie Breen VIC
 1953: Mrs (later Lady) Kathleen Sandover OBE JP WA
 1954: Hon Eileen Furley OBE NSW
 1955: Mrs (later Lady) Elizabeth Wilson CBE SA
 1956: Miss Millie Best MBE TAS
 1957: Mrs (later Dame) Audrey Reader VIC
 1958: Mrs M. Gordon OBE QLD
 1959: Mrs (later Hon) Eileen Furley OBE NSW
 1960: Mrs (later Dame) Mabel Miller TAS
 1961: Mrs (later Lady) Elizabeth Wilson CBE SA
 1963-64: Miss Iris Hyde NSW
 1965: Mrs (later Dame) Mabel Miller TAS
 1966-67: Mrs V Blogg MBE
 1967-70: Mrs Noelene Wheeler QLD
 1970-71: Mrs Margaret Daniel SA
 1971-72: Mrs Eileen Parr TAS
 1972-73: Mrs Audrey McKenna WA
 1973-74: Mrs Yvonne McComb QLD
 1974-76: Mrs (later Dame) Beryl Beaurepaire VIC
 1976-77: Mrs Althea McTaggart WA
 1977-80: Mrs Maureen Giddings NSW
 1980-85: Mrs Elizabeth Grant AM ACT
 1985-86: Mrs Cassie Solomon QLD
 1986-88: Ms (later Hon) Trish Worth (MHR) SA
 1988-90: Ms Nia Stavropoulos Tilley ACT
 1990-94: Mrs (later Hon) Joan Hall (MHA) SA
 1994-97: Mrs Chris McDiven AM NSW
 1997-99: Ms Penny Reader Harris SA
 1999-2004: Mrs Deirdre Flint TAS
 2004-2008: Mrs Theana Thompson VIC
 2008-    : Ms Robyn Nolan WA

External links
 History of the FWC
 Australian Women's Archives entry

1945 establishments in Australia
Liberal Party of Australia
Women's wings of political parties
Women's organisations based in Australia